Medieval music generally refers the music of Western Europe during the Middle Ages, from approximately the 6th to 15th centuries. The first and longest major era of Western classical music, medieval music includes composers of a variety of styles, often centered around a particular nationality or composition school. The lives of most medieval composers are generally little known, and some are so obscure that the only information available is what can be inferred from the contents and circumstances of their surviving music.

Composers of the Early Middle Ages (500–1000) almost exclusively concerned themselves with sacred music, writing in forms such as antiphons, hymns, masses, offices, sequences and tropes. Most composers were anonymous and the few whose names are known were monks or clergy. Of the known composers, the most significant are those from the Abbey of Saint Gall school, particularly Notker the Stammerer (Notker Balbulus); the Saint Martial school and its most prominent member, Adémar de Chabannes; and Wipo of Burgundy, to whom the well-known sequence "Victimae paschali laudes" is usually attributed.

In the High Middle Ages (1000–1250) sequences reached their peak with Adam of Saint Victor. By the late 11th century, the poet-composer troubadours of southern France became the first proponents of secular music to use musical notation; equivalent movements arose in the mid-12th century, with the Minnesang in Germany, trovadorismo in Galicia and Portugal, and the trouvères in northern France. Principal exponents of these traditions include troubadours Arnaut Daniel, Bertran de Born, Bernart de Ventadorn, William IX, Duke of Aquitaine; Minnesänger Gottfried von Strassburg, Hartmann von Aue, Reinmar von Hagenau and Walther von der Vogelweide; and trouvère Adam de la Halle, Blondel de Nesle and Chrétien de Troyes. Simultaneous with the spur of secular activity, Léonin and Pérotin of the religious Notre-Dame school (part of the broader ) developed polyphony in forms such as the clausula, conductus and organum. The nun Hildegard of Bingen was also a prolific sacred composer of this time.

During the Late Middle Ages (1250–1500) the age of secular national schools gradually faded away, in part due to the Albigensian Crusade. In France, the troubadours, trouvère and  music was succeeded by the  led by Philippe de Vitry and Guillaume de Machaut. The music of the Trecento in Italy led by Francesco Landini is sometimes considered part of the  style, but by the mid-14th century the movements had become too independent to warrant such a grouping. The major figures of  included both composers from France and Italy; particularly Johannes Ciconia and Solage.

Medieval composers

References

Notes

Citations

Sources

 
 
 
 
 
 
  

 
 
 
  
 

 
Medieval
Composers